Rachmat Yasin (born 4 November 1963) or Rahmat Yasin is an Indonesian politician from the United Development Party who served as the regent of Bogor Regency between 2008 and 2014. He was convicted of receiving bribes in 2014, and is currently in prison.

Before becoming regent, he had served some time in the regency's legislative body.

Background
Yasin was born in Bogor on 4 November 1963.

Career
Before being elected to public office, Yasin had been active at Nahdlatul Ulama, being the leader of Ansor Youth Movement's Bogor branch between 1984 and 1991. He was elected to Bogor's municipal council (DPRD Kabupaten Bogor) in 1997, and following the 2004 legislative election was appointed as its speaker.

In 2008, he was elected as regent after winning 990,351 votes (63.48%), being sworn in on 30 December 2008. He was reelected in 2013. He was also elected as chairman for PSSI's West Java office in 2013.

During his tenure, he destroyed multiple illegal villas in Puncak. He also initiated a program in which the regency's leaders and civil servants visited its subdistricts and villages weekly, dubbing them "Jumling" and "Boling" (Jumat Keliling and Rebo Keliling, lit. "Friday stroll" and "Wednesday stroll").

On 7 May 2014, he was apprehended by the Corruption Eradication Commission in his own house. Prior to his arrest, Yasin had been examined several times as a witness for other corruption cases. In November 2014, the Bandung Corruption Court sentenced him to 5.5 years in jail and a fine of Rp 300 million for charges of accepting Rp 4.5 billion of bribes to help with the conversion of woodlands areas. He was discharged dishonorably through a letter dated 20 January 2015, though he was previously discharged honorably in 25 November 2014 following a resignation he submitted. He was replaced by his deputy Nurhayanti. The corruption case also implicated Sentul City president director Swie Teng, who was sentenced to five years in prison for bribing Yasin.

During his incarceration, Rahmat managed to leave the prison and go to a rented house. The incident, along with some other graft convicts also doing the same, resulted in Law and Human Rights minister Yasonna Laoly opening an investigation into the prison staff.

Family
He is married to Elly Halimah Yasin, who is also active at the United Development Party. The couple has three children. Rahmat's sister Ade Yasin was elected as the regent of Bogor in the 2018 election.

References

1963 births
Living people
Mayors and regents of places in West Java
Indonesian politicians convicted of corruption
Politicians from West Java
People from Bogor
United Development Party politicians
Members of Indonesian regency councils
Regents of places in Indonesia